The Bukit Kuang Bridge is the main bridge on Chukai River in Kemaman District, Terengganu, Malaysia. It is located at Jalan Penghiburan (Federal Route 3). The bridge was opened on 2014.

See also
 Transport in Malaysia

Bridges in Terengganu
Kemaman District